Zaviyeh (also Romanized as Zāvīyeh and Zāvīeh; also known as Zāvīyeh-ye Sokmanābād, Zeiva, Zeyveh, and Zīveh) is a village in Sokmanabad Rural District of Safayyeh District of Khoy County, West Azerbaijan province, Iran. At the 2006 National Census, its population was 1,417 in 293 households. The following census in 2011 counted 1,603 people in 436 households. The latest census in 2016 showed a population of 1,640 people in 458 households; it was the largest village in its rural district.

References 

Khoy County

Populated places in West Azerbaijan Province

Populated places in Khoy County